Gloucester, a town in dairy and beef cattle country, is located in Mid-Coast Council, within the  Barrington Coast hinterland of the lower Mid North Coast of the state of New South Wales, Australia. It is the closest town to world heritage Barrington Tops National Park.

Gloucester is situated on the North Coast railway line and can be accessed from the southeast from Newcastle, located  via the Bucketts Way, or from the north via Thunderbolts Way. Gloucester River flows adjacent to the town, just above its junction with the Avon River.

At the 2016 census, Gloucester had a population of  people.

History 
The Gloucester district was first visited by government surveyor Henry Dangar in January 1826 and then by Robert Dawson, Chief Agent for the Australian Agricultural Company later in the same year, accompanied by Henry Dangar. Settlement occurred in the 1830s. The township of Gloucester was first established in 1855, primarily for sheep farming, however it became apparent that the land was not entirely suitable. The main industries of the Gloucester area are tourism, timber, and cattle farming. The timber industry has been prevalent in Gloucester since the late 19th century, and it and cattle farming (dairy and beef cattle) are still major industries in and around Gloucester.

In 1876, gold was discovered in Copeland, a small town north-west of Gloucester. Copeland became a large town of over  inhabitants due to the gold discovery and the large number of red cedar trees. However, the population has since dwindled to a few hundred.

The company employed surveyors in 1856-7 to undertake a trial survey for a railway between Port Stephens and Stroud and further north to the Manning River, passing what became Gloucester. At the time it was felt that with the "formidable obstructions" from ranges and rivers, a railway line would be impracticable and construction did not proceed, and coal mining was abandoned before it had commenced.

In 1923, electricity came to Gloucester. The Gloucester Electric Supply Company Ltd was formed by Fred Lowe, who was called to Gloucester by a syndicate (mainly of local graziers) to assist in the development of a Gloucester electric supply. He presented plans for a ‘turn key’ installation of the complete plant which was accepted by the syndicate. The shareholders in the new company were Fred and his brother Ernest, who jointly held the great majority of the shares, and a number of local people. There were many ups and downs, especially during 1929, the depression. In the middle 1930s, the State Government was offering subsidies for the construction of rural lines. The first rural line along the Bucketts Road was opened on 9 September 1938. Fred Lowe designed and surveyed the line exercising his expertise in surveying which he acquired whilst working in New Zealand as a young man.
In 1943 the company’s 20-year franchise ended. However it was wartime and the Mid-Coast County Council did not exercise its right to acquire the company’s assets and take over the electricity undertaking till 1 July 1946. Fred was employed by the Council as its electrical engineer. He still persisted with rural line extensions and completed the Avon Valley line taking electricity to Stratford. He remained as council electrical engineer until he retired in 1951. At a farewell function the Shire President, Cr. J.N. Channon, said, "We cannot let the opportunity pass without expressing our deep appreciation and gratitude to Mr Lowe for what he has done for Gloucester."

The Stratford mine is now owned by Yancoal and is the only operating coal mine in the valley.

In March 1972 the Governor of New South Wales, Sir Roden Cutler, VC and Lady Cutler toured the district and attended a formal Civic Reception at the Gloucester Bucketts Motel.

For most of the twentieth century it boasted two cinemas in the main thoroughfare - Church Street: The Star (opposite Permewans, closed c. 1968), and the Majestic Theatre, that was built in the early 1920s. The Majestic permanently closed its doors c. 1980 and the building still stands, now redeveloped as a shopping arcade.

The district's weekly newspaper is The Gloucester Advocate.

Events
Gloucester was the venue for the first Groovin' the Moo music festival held at the Gloucester Showground on 24 April 2005. The festival included well known musical acts such as Screaming Jets, Killing Heidi and Evermore. Although the festival has not returned to Gloucester, it has gone on to be an annual event held in regional areas across Australia.

Population
According to the 2016 census of Population, there were 2,390 people in Gloucester.
 Aboriginal and Torres Strait Islander people made up 10.8% of the population. 
 87.7% of people were born in Australia and 92.7% of people spoke only English at home. 
 The most common responses for religion were Anglican 31.3%, No Religion 23.5% and Catholic 15.0%.

Gallery

References

External links
Gloucester Information Page
Gloucester Baptist - Local Baptist Church
Gloucester Tourism information

Suburbs of Mid-Coast Council
Towns in the Hunter Region